Gornja Vijaka is a village in the municipality of Vareš, Bosnia and Herzegovina. It was formerly named Vijaka Gornja.

Demographics 
According to the 2013 census, its population was 57.

References

Populated places in Vareš